The tram route 51 in Brussels, Belgium is a tram route operated by the STIB/MIVB, which connects the Heysel metro station in the City of Brussels to the Van Haelen stop in the municipality of Uccle. The route runs North-South, crossing the municipalities of the City of Brussels, Jette, Molenbeek-Saint-Jean, the City of Brussels again, Saint-Gilles, Forest and Uccle.

Starting from the Stade/Stadion tram stop the route runs along the tram route 23 on a proper route parallel to the Boulevard du Centenaire/Eeuwfeestlaan up to the Centenaire/Eeuwfeest stop. At this point the route 23 turns left and the route 51 turns right, joining the tram route 19 on the Avenue Jean Sobieski/Jan Sobieskilaan. The route then follows the Boulevard de Smet de Naeyer/De Smet de Naeyerlaan, connecting with the Brussels Metro again at the Stuyvenbergh metro station. Past the Jette cemetery, the routes 19 and 51 separate, with the route 51 heading towards the Belgica metro station via the Avenue Charles Woeste/Charles Woestelaan, and then toward the Ribaucourt metro station via the Boulevard Belgica/Belgicalaan and the Boulevard du Jubilé/Jubelfeestlaan. At the Ribaucourt metro station the route joins the small ring road at the Place Sainctelette/Saincteletteplein via the Boulevard Léopold II/Leopold II Laan, crosses the Brussels–Scheldt Maritime Canal, connects with the metro at the Yser metro station, enters the city center of the City of Brussels, then runs along the canal up to the Ninove gate. At this point, the route 51 joins the tram route 82, running along the small ring road up to the Brussels-South railway station via the Lemonnier premetro station. At this latter metro station, the route enters the tunnel known as the North–South Axis, up to the Albert premetro station. These stops from Lemonnier to Albert connect with tram routes 3 and 4. When exiting the tunnel, the route 51 heads towards the Place de l'Altitude Cent, then joins the Chaussée d'Alsemberg/Alsembergsesteenweg up to the Uccle-Calevoet railway station, then joins again the Chaussée d'Alsemberg via the Rue Engeland/Engelandstraat and the Rue du Château d'Or/Gulden Kasteelstraat. It then stops at the Van Haelen stop on the Chaussée d'Alsemberg at the border between the Brussels-Capital Region and the Flemish municipality of Linkebeek.

See also
List of Brussels tram routes

References

External links
STIB/MIVB official website

51
City of Brussels
Forest, Belgium
Jette
Saint-Gilles, Belgium
Molenbeek-Saint-Jean
Uccle